Princess Adelheid of Anhalt-Bernburg-Schaumburg-Hoym (23 February 180013 September 1820) was a princess of Anhalt-Bernburg-Schaumburg-Hoym by birth as a daughter of Victor II, Prince of Anhalt-Bernburg-Schaumburg-Hoym. As the wife of Duke Paul Frederick Augustus of Oldenburg she became a Duchess of Oldenburg by marriage.

Birth and family
Princess Adelheid was born on 23 February 1800 at Schaumburg Castle. She was the second daughter of Victor II, Prince of Anhalt-Bernburg-Schaumburg-Hoym, and Princess Amelia of Nassau-Weilburg. Adelheid had three sisters: Hermine, Emma and Ida. She grew up with her sisters in Hoym in Anhalt.

Marriage
Adelheid married Duke Paul Frederick Augustus of Oldenburg on 24 July 1817 at Schaumburg Castle. The princess was just 17 years old when she married the 34-year-old duke. Duke Paul Frederick Augustus was the eldest son of Duke Peter of Oldenburg, heir to the Duchy of Oldenburg, and was thus second in line of succession after his father.

Adelheid and Augustus had two daughters; Amalia, who was born in 1818, and Friederike, who was born in 1820.

Death and aftermath
At the age of 20, and after three years of marriage, Princess Adelheid died suddenly on 13 September 1820 at Oldenburg. She was buried at the Ducal Mausoleum, at Saint Gertrude’s Cemetery in Oldenburg.

Augustus married Adelheid's younger sister, Princess Ida of Anhalt-Bernburg-Schaumburg-Hoym, in 1825 upon Adelheid’s death. Augustus became Grand Duke of Oldenburg in 1829.

Ancestry and descent

Ancestry

Issue

References

External links

1800 births
1820 deaths
Deaths in childbirth
House of Ascania
House of Oldenburg in Oldenburg
House of Holstein-Gottorp
Burials at the Ducal Mausoleum, Gertrudenfriedhof (Oldenburg)
Daughters of monarchs

sv:Hermine av Anhalt-Bernburg-Schaumburg-Hoym